Blue Grass is an unincorporated community on VA 642 at its junction with VA 640 in Highland County, Virginia, United States. It was previously known as Crabbottom and Hulls Store before the Board on Geographic Names officially decided upon Blue Grass in 1950. Near Blue Grass is the Devils Backbone rock formation. Blue Grass has a post office with ZIP code 24413. The Hollywood silent film classic Tol'able David was filmed in Blue Grass during 1921.

Notable people 
 Susan Swecker – Chair of the Democratic Party of Virginia, was raised there

References

Unincorporated communities in Highland County, Virginia
Unincorporated communities in Virginia